Oldham Pond is a  pond in Pembroke and Hanson, Massachusetts. The pond is a tributary to Furnace Pond. There are three islands located in the middle of the pond, the largest of which is named  Monument Island. On the Pembroke side of the pond, Oldham Village lies along the eastern shore, and Oldham Pines lies along the northeastern shore. Camp Pembroke, an all-girls Jewish summer camp, is located on this pond. The first camp out of Troop 1 Hanover, one of the oldest troops in Massachusetts, was held here in 1912.

References

External links
South Shore Coastal Watersheds - Lake Assessments
Environment Protection Agency

Ponds of Plymouth County, Massachusetts
Pembroke, Massachusetts
Hanson, Massachusetts
Ponds of Massachusetts